Michel André (born 2 September 1970) is a French bobsledder. He competed in the four man event at the 2002 Winter Olympics.

References

1970 births
Living people
French male bobsledders
Olympic bobsledders of France
Bobsledders at the 2002 Winter Olympics
Sportspeople from Paris